The Royal College of Surgeons of Edinburgh (RCSEd) is a professional organisation of surgeons. The College has seven active faculties, covering a broad spectrum of surgical, dental, and other medical practices. Its main campus is located on Nicolson Street, Edinburgh, within the Surgeons' Hall, designed by William Henry Playfair, and adjoining buildings. The main campus includes a skills laboratory, the Surgeons' Hall Museums, a medical and surgical library, and a hotel. A second office was opened in Birmingham (UK) in 2014 and an international office opened in Kuala Lumpur, Malaysia, in 2018.

It is one of the oldest surgical corporations in the world and traces its origins to 1505, when the Barber Surgeons of Edinburgh were formally incorporated as a craft of Edinburgh. The Barber-Surgeons of Dublin was the first medical corporation in Ireland or Britain, having been incorporated in 1446 (by Royal Decree of Henry VI).

RCSEd represents members and fellows across the UK and the world, spanning a number of disciplines, including surgery, dentistry, perioperative care, pre-hospital care, and remote, rural and humanitarian healthcare. The majority of its UK members are based in England with others across Wales, Scotland, and Northern Ireland. Its membership includes people at every stage of their career, from medical students through to trainees, consultants, and those who have retired from practice.

The Council is the governing body of RCSEd, and represents the professional interests of the College's membership. Decisions made by Council formulate policy and direct the College in its mission to promote the highest standards of surgical practice. As a charitable organisation, the Members of Council are also Trustees of the College. The Council comprises five Office-Bearers, 15 elected members, one Trainee member and the Dean of the Faculty of Dental Surgery.

History

The 16th century 
In 1505, the Barber Surgeons of Edinburgh were formally incorporated as a craft guild of the city, and this recognition is embodied in the Seal of Cause (or Charter of Privileges), which was granted to the Barber Surgeons by the Town Council of Edinburgh on 1 July 1505.

The Seal of Cause conferred various privileges and imposed certain crucially important duties, the most important of these that all apprentices should be literate, that every master should have full knowledge of anatomy and surgical procedures, and that this knowledge should be tested at the end of apprenticeship, all clauses still relevant to surgical practice and the College today.

The 17th century: the first permanent meeting place 

In 1647, the Incorporation of Surgeons acquired a permanent meeting place for the first time in rented rooms of a tenement in Dickson's Close. At the end of the century, work on what is now known as "Old Surgeons' Hall", in High School Yards, started and was completed and occupied by the Incorporation of Surgeons by 1697.

The 18th century: the growth of scientific medicine in Edinburgh 
In 1722 the Barbers formally separated from the Surgeons Incorporation by decreet of the Court of Session to found the Society of Barbers of Edinburgh, which would exist until 1922.

The University of Edinburgh Medical School (established in 1726) and The Royal Infirmary of Edinburgh were responsible for the rapid development in Edinburgh of systematic medical teaching on a sound scientific basis. Surgery, however, was perceived by many as still being a manual craft rather than an intellectual discipline, so members of the Incorporation of Surgeons undertook the task of education and did much to establish Edinburgh's reputation as a centre of surgical teaching. In 1778, King George III granted a new charter giving the surgeons' corporation the title "The Royal College of Surgeons of the City of Edinburgh".

The 19th century: a new meeting place, the Playfair Building 

By the beginning of the 19th century, the College had outgrown Old Surgeons' Hall and an urgent need arose for accommodation for the large collection of anatomical and surgical specimens which had been presented to the College by Dr John Barclay. A riding school in Nicolson Street was purchased and William Henry Playfair, 1790–1857, the foremost Scottish architect of that era, was commissioned to design a building containing a meeting hall, museum, lecture room, and library as its principal apartments. Surgeons' Hall was completed in May 1832, and formally opened two months later.

The 20th century: a period of expansion 
In July 1905, the College celebrated the fourth centenary of its incorporation, and as part of the celebrations, conferred honorary fellowship upon 36 of the world's most distinguished surgeons. These included Lord Lister, the acknowledged Father of Modern Surgery, who had become a fellow in 1855. In 1955, on the 450th anniversary of the foundation of the College, the honorary fellowship was conferred upon His Royal Highness, the Duke of Edinburgh, who had consented to become patron of the College earlier that year. A derelict tenement on Hill Place was made available to the college by Edinburgh District Council and was topped out in May 1981.

The 21st century: the College today 
The College celebrated its quincentenary in 2005 with the opening of a new skills laboratory and conference venue, as well as its Ten Hill Place Hotel. Today, the College continues to serve its original role, to continue education, assessment, and the advancement of surgeons and surgery. In April 2014, the College opened a regional centre in Birmingham to cater for the 80% of its UK membership based in England and Wales.

Examinations
To be admitted as a member to the College, trainee surgeons are required to sit and pass Membership of the Royal College of Surgeons (MRCS) examinations, which usually happen in the first or second years of surgical training. Since September 2008, the MRCS has become an intercollegiate examination, with a syllabus, format, and content common to all three Colleges in the UK (the Royal College of Surgeons of Edinburgh, the Royal College of Surgeons of England, and the Royal College of Physicians and Surgeons of Glasgow).

The College conducts a number of other examinations, including dental examinations, immediate medical care examinations, and sport and exercise medicine.

Education
The Royal College of Surgeons of Edinburgh runs a large range of educational events and courses for medical students interested in surgery, through to surgical trainees and consultant specialists. Many of these courses are held in the Surgical Skills Laboratory on site in Edinburgh, but the College does also conduct courses abroad.

It offers distance-learning courses through its department of eLearning. The Post-Graduate Certificate in Remote and Offshore Medicine (CertROM) is an example of a course that consists entirely of online modules, although for the diploma (DipROM) attendance of a workshop is also required.

Faculties

The Faculty of Dental Surgery 
Dentistry has been an important part of the Royal College of Surgeons of Edinburgh since the Incorporation of Barber Surgeons were granted their Seal of Cause by Edinburgh Town Council in 1505, though it remained largely unregulated in Edinburgh until the middle of the 19th century. In 1879 the Diploma of Licentiate in Dental Surgery (LDS) was introduced and recognised for admission to the Dentist's Register. In 1921, the Dentists Act raised standards, and only dentists who had been trained in a dental school could be admitted to the Register and allowed to practise dentistry.

The Edinburgh Dental School became part of the University of Edinburgh in 1948 and graduates were awarded the Bachelor of Dental Surgery (BDS). The same year, the College introduced the diploma of Fellowship in Dental Surgery (FDSRCSEd). In 1982, Dental Surgery became a distinct faculty within the College and continues to concentrate on the education, training and maintenance of standards of professional competence and conduct.

It is the largest of the College's faculties with almost 7,000 Fellows and Members worldwide and has its own Council. The Dental Faculty's portfolio consists of a wide range of exams and courses held in 17 countries around the world.

The Faculty of Dental Trainers 
The Faculty of Dental Trainers was launched in 2016 by the Faculty of Dental Surgery of The Royal College of Surgeons of Edinburgh. The purpose of the Faculty is to enhance patient care and safety by promoting the highest standards of training in dentistry and to support trainers in developing their roles. The Faculty is open to all members of the dental team.

The Faculty of Surgical Trainers 
The Faculty of Surgical Trainers is open to anyone who has an active interest or involvement in surgical training in the UK and internationally, regardless of College affiliation.

The Faculty is the first of its kind in the UK and its purpose is to help support and develop surgeons in their role as surgical trainers.

The Faculty of Perioperative Care 
RCSEd established the Faculty of Perioperative Care in recognition of the evolving and increasingly important role that Surgical Care Practitioners and Surgical First Assistants play as part of the wider surgical team in delivering safe surgical care to patients.

The Faculty is available to all perioperative practitioners, including trainees, such as: Surgical Care Practitioners; Surgical First Assistants; and all those with similar titles involved in the delivery of high quality surgical care.

The Faculty of Pre-Hospital Care 
Pre-hospital care is a well-established branch of medicine, now practised by a broad range of practitioners from first aiders, paramedics, doctors, nurses, first responders, voluntary aid workers and remote medics including multi agency teams such as police, fire and armed forces.

The Faculty's aim is to set and maintain clinical standards for all practitioners in this evolving specialty. They run the Diploma of Immediate Medical Care, which covers prehospital care competencies. This exam utilises the Sandpiper Bag designed and provided by Sandpiper Trust.

The Faculty of Remote, Rural and Humanitarian Healthcare 
The Faculty of Remote and Rural Healthcare (FRRHH) was formally launched in November 2018, incorporating Humanitarian in its structure in August 2020.

The faculty was established in response to the need identified within both industry and the public health arena to define, review and set standards of competence for organisations as well as medical and non-medical personnel delivering healthcare in remote and rural environments. The new faculty has been developed alongside a number of partner organisations including: UK-MED, MediLink International, BASICS Scotland, the College of Remote and Offshore Medicine and others.

The Faculty of Sport and Exercise Medicine 
The Faculty of Sport and Exercise Medicine works to develop and promote the medical specialty of Sport and Exercise Medicine.

The specialty is concerned with the accurate diagnosis, management and prevention of medical conditions and injury in those who participate in physical activity.

Surgeons' Hall Museums

The Museums linked to the College is open to the public and houses one of the largest collections of pathological artifacts in Britain. The museums date from 1699 and underwent major improvements in 2015.

Previous Conservators of the museums include John Goodsir, William Rutherford Sanders, James Bell Pettigrew, David Middleton" Greig, and D. E. C. Mekie.

The Museums consist of the Wohl Pathology Museum, the History of Surgery Museum and The Dental Collection. The collections represent the changing nature of medical and scientific teaching and research since the late 18th century.

See also
 List of presidents of the Royal College of Surgeons of Edinburgh
 The Association of Surgeons in Training
 Royal College of Surgeons in Ireland

References

External links
 The Royal College of Surgeons of Edinburgh Official website
 Surgeons' Hall Museums website
 College online journal
 Surgeons' Hall
 Ten Hill Place Hotel, owned by The Royal College of Surgeons of Edinburgh
 Faculty of Pre-Hospital Care

1505 establishments in Scotland
Health in Edinburgh
Surgeons of Edinburgh
Organisations based in Edinburgh
Organizations established in the 1500s
College of Surgeons
Professional associations based in Scotland
 
Science and technology in Edinburgh
Scottish medical associations
Surgical organisations based in the United Kingdom